Linwood Winder McCarthy (February 23, 1918 – November 23, 2002) was an American film, television and theatre actor.

Born in Norfolk, Virginia, McCarthy served in the military during World War II, and afterwards studied acting at Geller's Theatre Workshop. He made his stage debut in 1952 in the Broadway play The Chase.

McCarthy guest-starred in numerous television programs, including Boris Karloff's Thriller, The Man and the Challenge, Mission: Impossible, The Fugitive, Tales of Wells Fargo, The Rifleman, Gunsmoke, Robert Montgomery Presents, Wagon Train, Quincy, M.E., 12 O'Clock High, Rawhide, Studio One in Hollywood, Lou Grant, Kraft Television Theatre, The Waltons and The Virginian. He also appeared in films such as Yellowneck, Tail Gunner Joe, The D.I., Face of a Fugitive, The Execution of Private Slovik and The Day After. McCarthy retired in 1984.

McCarthy died in November 2002 of pneumonia in Beverly Hills, California, at the age of 84.

References

External links 

Rotten Tomatoes profile

1918 births
2002 deaths
Deaths from pneumonia in California
Male actors from Virginia
American male film actors
American male television actors
American theatre people
American male stage actors
Western (genre) television actors
20th-century American male actors
American military personnel of World War II
People from Norfolk, Virginia